The 4400 is a science fiction television series produced by CBS Paramount Network Television in association with Sky Television, Renegade 83 and American Zoetrope for USA Network in the United States and Sky One in the United Kingdom. The show was created and written by Scott Peters and René Echevarria, and it stars Joel Gretsch and Jacqueline McKenzie. The series ran for four seasons from 2004 until its cancellation in 2007. 

In the pilot episode, what was originally thought to be a comet deposits a group of exactly 4400 people at Highland Beach, in the Cascade Range foothills near Mount Rainier, Washington. Each of the 4400 had disappeared at various times starting from 1946 in a beam of white light. None of the 4400 have aged from the time of their disappearance. Confused and disoriented, they remember nothing of events occurring between the time of their disappearance and their return.

Series overview

Episodes

Season 1 (2004)

Season 2 (2005)

Season 3 (2006)

Season 4 (2007)

Specials

References

External links 
 
 

 
Lists of American science fiction television series episodes

it:4400 (serie televisiva)#Episodi